Ty Johnson or Tyrone Johnson may refer to:

 Ty Johnson (American football), American football running back for the New York Jets of the NFL
 Ty Johnson (comics), Marvel Comics character in the superhero duo known as Cloak and Dagger
 Tyrone Johnson (basketball) (born 1992), American professional basketball player

See also 
 Tyler Johnson (disambiguation)